Leonard Lansink (born 7 January 1956) is a German actor. He appeared in more than one hundred films since 1983.

Selected filmography

References

External links 

1956 births
Living people
German male film actors
German male television actors
20th-century German male actors
21st-century German male actors